Chang Chia-che (born 22 April 1983) is a Taiwanese long-distance runner who specializes in the marathon.

He finished tenth at the 2006 Asian Games, 28th at the 2007 World Championships, 38th at the 2009 World Championships, and 32nd at the 2013 World Championships. In regional competition, he was the bronze medallist in the half marathon at the 2009 East Asian Games. He placed tenth in the marathon at the 2010 Asian Games, repeating his position from  the last edition.

He was third at the 2008 Hofu Yomiuri Marathon and ran a personal best time of 2:17:12 hours. He improved upon this four seasons later at the 2012 Pyongyang Marathon, where his time of 2:16:06 hours brought him seventh place.

Achievements

References

1983 births
Living people
Taiwanese male marathon runners
Taiwanese male long-distance runners
Olympic athletes of Taiwan
Athletes (track and field) at the 2012 Summer Olympics
Athletes (track and field) at the 2006 Asian Games
Athletes (track and field) at the 2010 Asian Games
World Athletics Championships athletes for Chinese Taipei
Asian Games competitors for Chinese Taipei
21st-century Taiwanese people